Udranomia is a genus of Neotropical butterflies in the family Hesperiidae, in which it is placed in tribe Entheini. It was established in 1870 by Arthur Gardiner Butler.

Species
Per Li et al. 2019, the genus contains the following species:
Udranomia eurus (Mabille & Boullet, 1919) – Venezuela
Udranomia tomdaleyi Burns, 2017
Udranomia sallydaleyae Burns, 2017
Udranomia kikkawai (Weeks, 1906) – Venezuela, Mexico
Udranomia orcinus (C. & R. Felder, [1867]) – Mexico, Brazil - type species, as Eudamus orcinus.
Udranomia spitzi (Hayward, 1942) Brazil

Original publication

References

Natural History Museum Lepidoptera genus database

Eudaminae
Butterflies of North America
Butterflies of Central America
Hesperiidae of South America
Hesperiidae genera
Taxa named by Arthur Gardiner Butler